Ludvig Valentin Lorenz (18 January 1829 – 9 June 1891) was a Danish physicist and mathematician. He developed mathematical formulae to describe phenomena such as the relation between the refraction of light and the density of a pure transparent substance, and the relation between a metal's electrical and thermal conductivity and temperature (Wiedemann–Franz–Lorenz law).

Biography
Lorenz was born in Helsingør and studied at the Technical University in Copenhagen. He became professor at the Military Academy in Copenhagen 1876. From 1887, his research was funded by the Carlsberg Foundation. He investigated the mathematical description for light propagation through a single homogeneous medium and described the passage of light between different media. The formula for the mathematical relationship between the refractive index and the density of a medium was published by Lorenz in 1869 and by Hendrik Lorentz (who discovered it independently) in 1878 and is therefore called the Lorentz–Lorenz equation. Using his electromagnetic theory of light he stated what is known as the Lorenz gauge condition, and was able to derive a correct value for the velocity of light. He also developed a theory of light scattering, publishing it in Danish in 1890 and in French in his Collected Works, published in 1898. It was later independently rediscovered by Gustav Mie in 1908, so it is sometimes referred to as Lorenz–Mie theory. Additionally, Lorenz laid the foundations for ellipsometry by using Fresnel's theory of refraction to discover that light reflected by a thin transition layer between two media becomes elliptically polarized.

References

External links 
 Scienceworld
 Cartage.org.lb
 "Sur la lumière réfléchie et réfractée par une sphère transparente" pp. 405-529, Œuvres scientifiques de L. Lorenz, Volume 1
 "Modern Electrodynamics" pp. 789-790

1829 births
1891 deaths
People from Helsingør
19th-century Danish mathematicians
Danish physicists
Optical physicists